Diploconger polystigmatus, or the headband conger, is a species of eel in the family Congridae. It is the only member of its genus. It is only found in the Indian Ocean off the western Pacific Ocean at depths of 37–215 meters.

Size

References

Congridae
Taxa named by Adolf Kotthaus
Fish described in 1968